Saba Saba Day on 7 July celebrates (among other things) the 1954 founding of the Tanzanian political party, TANU, the Tanganyika African National Union. Saba Saba is in Swahili which means seven seven in English. Swahili is the national language of Tanzania (and of Tanganyika and Zanzibar, the two countries whose union created the United Republic of Tanzania in 1964). Saba Saba also may refer to the Dar es Salaam International Trade Fair. The fair is held every year on this date in Saba Saba grounds near Kurasini in Dar es Salaam.

Kenya
In Kenya, Saba Saba Day is remembered as the day in when nation-wide protests took place. On 7 July 1990, Kenyans took to the streets to demand free elections. The politicians who had called for the protests, Kenneth Matiba and Charles Rubia, were arrested days before the protest day. Other organisers of the day such as Njeru Gathangu, George Anyona, Raila Odinga etc were beaten up and detained by the then tyrannical dictator President Moi.

In present day Kenya, Saba Saba has taken on a new meaning, with human rights defenders (HRDs) and civil society organisations such as Inuka Kenya Ni Sisi, Kenya Human Rights Commission, National Coalition for Human Rights Defenders, the Social Justice Centres' Working Group and Mathare Social Justice Center among others asking for respect of the constitution, an end to police brutality and killings, advocating for a favourable legal and policy environment in Kenya. 

On the 30th anniversary of the Saba Saba, the Kenyan police unlawfully teargassed and arrested activists who had taken to the streets to demand for basic rights. Among other things, they are asking for clean water, good housing and an end to abuse from those who are in power.

References

External links
 The official website of the trade fair

Remembrance days
Society of Tanzania
July observances